The Eastmain River, formerly written East Main, is a river in west central Quebec. The First Nations Cree village of Eastmain is located beside the mouth.

Name
Eastmain is a compounding of the river's former name East Main, which was taken from the former Hudson's Bay Company outpost at its mouth, which controlled the its operations in the East Main District on the eastern side of James Bay.

Geography
The remainder of the Eastmain River contains only about 10 percent of the volume of its former flow, and is now subject to freeze-up in winter (see photo). These changes have affected the Cree and Inuit peoples who live along the Eastmain River and James Bay coast.

A further hydroelectric project on the upper Eastmain River was under construction in 2005. The project was part of the original hydroelectric project provided for by the James Bay and Northern Quebec Agreement of 1975.

History
The mouth of the Eastmain was a centre of the Hudson's Bay Company fur trade. Charles Bayly reached it from Rupert House in the 1670s. After Rupert House was destroyed in 1686, the area was visited by a ship from York Factory. In 1723 to 1724, Joseph Myatt of the Hudson's Bay Company built a post.

See also
Centrale Eastmain-1
James Bay Project
Jamésie
List of rivers of Quebec
List of longest rivers of Canada

References

Rivers of Nord-du-Québec
James Bay Project
Tributaries of James Bay